Kabaty  is a residential neighborhood in Ursynów, the southernmost district of Warsaw. Sparsely populated until the late 1980s, Kabaty witnessed rapid growth in the 1990s and especially the 2000s.  It is located near the Kabaty Woods, a popular weekend destination for Warsaw citizens.

History 
Kabaty has been inhabited for at least 600 years. A village of that name was first mentioned in 1386 as belonging to Andrzej Ciołek, standard-bearer of Płock. Prince Janusz I of Masovia granted it Chełm Law (a local variant of Magdeburg Law) and a certain degree of internal autonomy. Until the 16th century the village remained part of the Ciołek family domain. In the 1580 census it was reported as covering some s.

In the early 17th century the village was transferred to the Piekarski family.  In 1656 it was completely destroyed by Swedish armies during The Deluge. In 1721 the village of Kabaty, located on the Wisła River, was purchased by Elżbieta Sieniawska, widow of Hetman Adam Mikołaj Sieniawski and owner of  Wilanów Palace. The village was rebuilt after a plague.

Elżbieta Sieniawska, who also bought the surrounding Kabaty Woods, ordered protection for its animals and trees. Even the wood needed to build her new manor in 1726 was transported from Nieporęt rather than from the surrounding forest. In 1775 the village had 16 houses and a szlachta manor. By 1827 it had grown to 17 houses and 177 inhabitants, mostly serfs.

In 1864, after the January 1863 Uprising, the village was administratively attached to Wilanów. By 1905 it had 38 houses and 319 inhabitants. After Poland regained independence in 1918, the village became a popular summer vacation place for nearby Warsaw. The forest was parcelled, and a small resort was built there with 8 houses and 61 permanent inhabitants (in addition to 59 houses and 397 inhabitants in the village itself).

In 1937 the Polish General Staff's Cipher Bureau moved to a specially constructed facility in the Kabaty Woods.

The following year, Warsaw's president (mayor) Stefan Starzyński purchased the Kabaty Woods for the city and turned them into a park and forest reserve. The Woods are now named after Starzyński.

During World War II, they were a scene of partisan warfare against Poland's German occupiers. The heaviest fighting around Kabaty took place during the 1944 Warsaw Uprising, when Home Army units from southern Poland sought to break through to Warsaw via the Woods.

After the war, the village and the fields adjacent to the Woods were nationalized and treated as a space for Warsaw's further expansion. It was not until 1951, however, that it became part of Warsaw, included in the newly created district of Ursynów. In the 1990s the area was built up with apartment blocks and single-family houses, and agricultural activity was discontinued. The area is now one of the fastest-growing parts of Warsaw. Due to its proximity to the Woods — a popular weekend destination for Varsovians — it is considered especially desirable among the middle class.

Kabaty has two Warsaw Metro facilities: the Kabaty train yard, and the Kabaty station itself, the southern terminus of line no. 1, beneath the intersection of Wąwozowa Street and KEN Avenue.

See also
 Cipher Bureau (Biuro Szyfrów)
 Kabaty Woods (Las Kabacki)
 Kabaty metro station (Stacja metra Kabaty)

Notes

References
 A revised and augmented translation of Kozaczuk's W kręgu enigmy, Warsaw, Książka i Wiedza, 1979, supplemented with appendices by Marian Rejewski

Neighbourhoods of Ursynów
Cipher Bureau (Poland)